The Biltmore–Cumberland Historic District is a U.S. historic district (designated as such on June 4, 2004) located in Lakeland, Florida. The district is bounded by South Ingraham Avenue, East Lime Street, Bartow Road, Hollingsworth Road, and McDonald Place. It contains 201 historic buildings.

References

External links
 Polk County listings at National Register of Historic Places

Lakeland, Florida
National Register of Historic Places in Polk County, Florida
Historic districts on the National Register of Historic Places in Florida